Emanuele Troise (born 10 February 1979) is an Italian football coach and a former player. He is the head coach of Cavese.

Playing career
A defender, Troise started his professional career with Napoli, making his first team debut during the club's successful 1999–2000 Serie B campaign, and then making his Serie A debut the following season.

He successively played at Serie A level with Bologna for a single season before moving down the leagues, also playing a stint at Super League Greece club Panthrakikos between 2008 and 2010.

Coaching career
In 2012, Troise joined his former teammate Fabio Pecchia as his assistant at Latina. In 2014 he moved back to his former team Bologna as a technical collaborator, a role he left a year later to join Casertana as a youth coach.

In 2016 Troise returned at Bologna, this time as a youth coach, first in charge of the Under-17 team, then for the Under-19 Primavera team. On 7 August 2020, he was appointed head coach of newly promoted Serie C club Mantova on what was his first role as a first team manager in his career.

On 23 November 2021, he was hired by Serie D club Cavese.

References

External links
 Profile at playerhistory.com

1979 births
Living people
Italian footballers
Italian expatriate footballers
Association football defenders
Serie A players
Serie B players
Ternana Calcio players
U.S. Salernitana 1919 players
Bologna F.C. 1909 players
S.S.C. Napoli players
Panthrakikos F.C. players
Calcio Foggia 1920 players
Expatriate footballers in Greece
Italian football managers
Cavese 1919 managers
Serie C managers